B. nepalensis may refer to:

 Bellulia nepalensis, a Nepalese moth
 Berberis nepalensis, a shrub with edible berries
 Boreoheptagyia nepalensis, a non-biting midge
 Bradycellus nepalensis, a ground beetle